Specific energy density may refer to:
 Energy density, energy per unit volume
 Specific energy, energy per unit mass